The rusty plum aphid (Hysteroneura setariae) is an aphid in the superfamily Aphidoidea in the order Hemiptera. It is a true bug and sucks sap from plants.

It is known from Yemen, and has also been recorded feeding on sorghum and other millets in the United States.

References 

 fauna-eu.org
 http://erec.ifas.ufl.edu/publications/pdf/fact_sheets/RustyPlumAphidOnSeashorePaspalumTurfgrass.pdf
 http://www.bioone.org/doi/abs/10.1653/024.096.0237
 http://www.discoverlife.org/mp/20q?search=Hysteroneura+setariae
 http://bie.ala.org.au/species/Rusty+Plum+Aphid

Aphidini
Agricultural pest insects
Invertebrates of the Arabian Peninsula
Insect pests of millets